The Power Windows Tour was a concert tour by Canadian rock band Rush, in support of the band's eleventh studio album Power Windows.

Background
Prior to the tour's start, the band embarked on a short warm-up tour of four shows in Florida which the band called the "Spring Training" tour. The tour officially started on December 4, 1985 at the Cumberland County Civic Center in Portland, Maine and concluded on May 26, 1986 at the Pacific Amphitheatre in Costa Mesa, California. Select songs at the two East Rutherford, New Jersey shows were recorded for the 1989 live album A Show of Hands. Opening bands on the tour included Steve Morse, Marillion, FM, Blue Öyster Cult, The Fabulous Thunderbirds and Kick Axe.

Reception
Ethlie Ann Vare from Billboard opened their review of the band's performance in Inglewood, noting the band as an anomaly in arena rock, stating that the band drew the same crowd as Van Halen or Motley Crue and delivered a jazz-based, laid-back sophisticated performance, yet continued to excite the sold out audience of fans attending the show. The only criticisms that were given was Geddy Lee's vocals which were considered "cruel and unusual punishment to some", as well as stating the band can be boring. However Ann Vare stated that it was refreshing to see a band in the heavy rock genre that satisfies its fans without pandering to them.

Greg Barr from the Ottawa Citizen gave the Ottawa performance he attended a positive review. He opened his review, stating that the band had reached a pinnacle of technical and musical prowess, being compared to familiar acts like Van Halen and Bruce Springsteen. He praised the visuals and music, noting on the show as well-paced and choreographed, noting on the inclusion of lasers, a laser-holograph generator, a 35mm rear screen movie projector and a group of masked native dancers on the film screen behind the band. Regarding the effects and visuals, Barr stated that it would have the audience talking about it for some time. He praised Peart's drum solo which has praised as "spell-binding", noting on him using two different drum sets that swiveled around like gun-turrets on the deck of a battleship.

Setlist
These are example setlists adapted from Rush: Wandering the Face of the Earth – The Official Touring History of what were performed during the tour, but may not represent the majority of the shows.

Warm Up leg
"The Spirit of Radio"
"Subdivisions"
"The Body Electric"
"The Enemy Within"
"The Weapon"
"Witch Hunt"
"The Big Money"
"New World Man"
"Between the Wheels"
"Red Barchetta"
"Distant Early Warning"
"Red Sector A"
"Closer to the Heart"
"Middletown Dreams"
"YYZ"
"2112 Part II: The Temples of Syrinx"
"Tom Sawyer"
Encore
"Red Lenses" (with drum solo)
"Vital Signs"
"Finding My Way"
"In the Mood"

North American leg
"The Spirit of Radio"
"Limelight"
"The Big Money"
"New World Man"
"Subdivisions"
"Manhattan Project"
"Middletown Dreams"
"Witch Hunt"
"Red Sector A"
"Closer to the Heart"
"Marathon"
"The Trees"
"Mystic Rhythms"
"Distant Early Warning"
"Territories"
"YYZ" (with drum solo)
"Red Lenses"
"Tom Sawyer"
Encore
"2112 Parts I & II: Overture/The Temples of Syrinx"
"Grand Designs"
"In The Mood"

Tour dates

Box office score data

Personnel
 Geddy Lee – vocals, bass, keyboards
 Alex Lifeson – guitar, backing vocals
 Neil Peart – drums

References

Citations

Sources
 
 

Rush (band) concert tours
1985 concert tours
1986 concert tours
Concert tours of North America
Concert tours of the United States
Concert tours of Canada